Nancy Lois Gordon Gruver (August 12, 1931 – January 28, 1990) was an American bridge player. She won more than a dozen American Contract Bridge League (ACBL) "national" championships and finished second in two world championships.

Gruver graduated from the University of Maryland and lived for some time in Ellicott City, Maryland. She died of a heart attack at Howard County General Hospital in Columbia, survived by her husband John A. Gruver, one daughter and one son.

In World Bridge Federation (WBF) competition, her second-place finishes were in 1966, playing with Sue Sachs in the second quadrennial World Women Pairs Championship, and in 1981 Venice Cup, playing with Edith Kemp on the 6-person USA women team.

Bridge accomplishments

Wins

 North American Bridge Championships (14)
 Rockwell Mixed Pairs (1) 1977 
 Whitehead Women's Pairs (2) 1965, 1986 
 Smith Life Master Women's Pairs (3) 1967, 1979, 1981 
 Machlin Women's Swiss Teams (1) 1982 
 Wagar Women's Knockout Teams (6) 1966, 1973, 1978, 1980, 1982, 1984 
 Chicago Mixed Board-a-Match (1) 1975

Runners-up

 North American Bridge Championships
 Rockwell Mixed Pairs (1) 1976 
 Smith Life Master Women's Pairs (2) 1975, 1980 
 Wagar Women's Knockout Teams (1) 1969

References

External links

 

1931 births
1990 deaths
American contract bridge players
Venice Cup players
People from Ellicott City, Maryland
University of Maryland, College Park alumni